In geometry, the octagonal prism is the sixth in an infinite set of prisms, formed by rectangular sides and two regular octagon caps.

If faces are all regular, it is a semiregular polyhedron.

Symmetry

Images 
The octagonal prism can also be seen as a tiling on a sphere:

Use 

In optics, octagonal prisms are used to generate flicker-free images in movie projectors.

In uniform honeycombs and 4-polytopes 
It is an element of three uniform honeycombs: 

It is also an element of two four-dimensional uniform 4-polytopes:

Related polyhedra

External links
 
 Interactive model of an Octagonal Prism

Zonohedra
Prismatoid polyhedra